The 1927–28 season was the 23rd year of football played by Dundee United, and covers the period from 1 July 1927 to 30 June 1928.

Match results
Dundee United played a total of 42 matches during the 1927–28 season.

Legend

All results are written with Dundee United's score first.
Own goals in italics

Second Division

Scottish Cup

References

Dundee United F.C. seasons
Dundee United